"Otherside of America" is a protest song by American rapper Meek Mill. The song tackles racial inequality and racism in the United States. It was released on June 5, 2020, amid the Black Lives Matter and George Floyd protests against police brutality in the United States, in the wake of the murder of George Floyd. In the intro, the song contains dialogue from President Donald Trump's "crass" 2016 comments about black Americans.

Background 
In the song, Meek Mill illustrates how systemic racism has affected his life, through his own encounters with law enforcement. In 2007, he was arrested in South Philadelphia on a gun and drug charge, and finally, in August 2019, he pled guilty to a misdemeanor while all other charges were absolved. Known for his activism work, in 2019, he co-founded the REFORM Alliance, an organization dedicated to prison reform. He has also advocated for reform in the probation and parole system of Pennsylvania. Meek revealed that Nipsey Hussle and Saint Jhn were initially featured on the song.

Composition
Backed by a "rumbling", "thumping" beat, the song, as noted by The Sources Miss2Bees, "amplifies the voices of ongoing protests against systemic racism and police brutality". Meek also touches on his personal experiences with police brutality and his upbringing in Philadelphia and references his prison stint in 2017.

Intro 
"Otherside of America" opens with an audio dialogue of President Donald Trump's 2016 comments about the black community, in which he suggested they should vote for him because, "You're living in poverty, your schools are no good, you have no jobs, 58 percent of your youth is unemployed – what the hell do you have to lose?". Meek then juxtaposes Trump's statements, beginning his verse with: "Reporting live from the other side of America", telling the story of when he "was just a shorty / then I started spittin' godly, and they said 'record me", going back through his various times in jail while rising to fame.

Outro 
The song concludes with audio of Meek talking to CNN's Michael A. Smerconish, in an excerpt taken from a 2018 interview between the two. In verified commentary with lyrics annotation website Genius, Meek explained the inspiration for its inclusion in the song: "This interview took place the morning Championships came out. It was early in the morning the day after my release party and I could just feel the love from everyone about the album dropping". The song ends with Meek asking Smerconish, "You see murder, you even see seven people die a week, I think you would carry a gun yourself. Would you?", to which Smerconish replies, "Uh, yeah, I probably would".

Cover art 
According to Meek, the cover art is an image taken at the 2020 George Floyd protests in Philadelphia.

Critical reception
Tyler Schmitt of Variance magazine called the track "gripping". Both Rolling Stones Daniel Kreps and Cerys Kenneally of The Line of The Best Fit said Meek has "hard-hitting bars", with Kenneally noting the song for being "a timely track which tackles issues of racial inequality". ABC News Radio called the track "passionate", as Meek "expresses his anguish and fear towards police" following George Floyd's murder. Likiewise, Complexs  Joe Price labeled it "passionate" and "fiery". Dan DeLuca of The Philadelphia Inquirer also called it "passionate", and Meek's salvo, "hard-hitting". Entertainment Weeklys Marcus Jones named it one of the five best songs of the week, asserting "If there is one black American artist capable of sharing intimate details on what the specter of the police state feels like, it's Meek Mill". Nina Corcoran of Consequence of Sound said the song should not be mistaken for "your usual protest song", emphasizing how Meek "spends his time talking about the effects of poverty, violence, and racism on black kids-turned-teenagers with nuance and vivid imagery". Spin magazine said "Mill uses incisive lyrics to trace the perils of what African-Americans are going through and have gone through". Sidney Madden of NPR said although the song's theme is not new territory for Meek, "the bars hold even more weight in this moment".

Charts

See also 

 "The Bigger Picture", a song by Lil Baby, also released in June 2020, and associated with Black Lives Matter and George Floyd

References 
 

2020 singles
2020 songs
Meek Mill songs
Songs written by Meek Mill
Protest songs
Black Lives Matter art
Political rap songs
Songs about police brutality
Donald Trump in popular culture
Atlantic Records singles
Maybach Music Group singles